Ashvale may refer to:

Ashvale, a Welsh village
The Ashvale, a Scottish chain of fish and chip restaurants